3703 Volkonskaya, provisional designation , is a Vestian asteroid and asynchronous binary system from the inner regions of the asteroid belt, approximately  in diameter. It was discovered on 9 August 1978, by Soviet astronomers Lyudmila Chernykh and Nikolai Chernykh at the Crimean Astrophysical Observatory in Nauchnij, on the Crimean peninsula. It was named by the discoverers after the Russian princess Mariya Volkonskaya. The V-type asteroid has a rotation period of 3.2 hours. The discovery of its 1.4-kilometer minor-planet moon was announced in December 2005.

Orbit and classification 

Volkonskaya is a member of the Vesta family, when applying the hierarchical clustering method to its proper orbital elements. Vestian asteroids have a composition akin to cumulate eucrites (HED meteorites) and are thought to have originated deep within 4 Vesta's crust, possibly from the Rheasilvia crater, a large impact crater on its southern hemisphere near the South pole, formed as a result of a subcatastrophic collision. Vesta is the main belt's second-largest and second-most-massive body after . Based on osculating Keplerian orbital elements, the asteroid has also been classified as a member of the Flora family, a giant asteroid family and the largest family of stony asteroids in the main-belt.

Volkonskaya orbits the Sun in the inner asteroid belt at a distance of 2.0–2.6 AU once every 3 years and 7 months (1,301 days; semi-major axis of 2.33 AU). Its orbit has an eccentricity of 0.13 and an inclination of 7° with respect to the ecliptic. The body's observation arc begins with a precovery taken at the Palomar Observatory in August 1953, or 25 years prior to its official discovery observation at Nauchnij.

Physical characteristics 

Volkonskaya is a V-type asteroid.

Rotation period 

In June 1996, a rotational lightcurve of Volkonskaya was obtained from photometric observations by American astronomer William Ryan. Lightcurve analysis gave a well-defined rotation period of 3.235 hours with a brightness amplitude of 0.22 magnitude.

Diameter and albedo 

According to the survey carried out by the NEOWISE mission of NASA's Wide-field Infrared Survey Explorer, Volkonskaya measures 3.729 kilometers in diameter and its surface has an albedo of 0.242, while the Collaborative Asteroid Lightcurve Link assumes an albedo of 0.24 – derived from 8 Flora, the parent body of the Flora family – and calculates a diameter of 4.11 kilometers based on an absolute magnitude of 14.1.

Satellite 

The discovery was announced in December 2005. The mutual occultation events suggest the presence of a satellite with an estimated diameter  or 40% the size of its primary.

Naming 

This minor planet was numbered on 7 October 1987. It was named after Russian princess Mariya Volkonskaya (1805–1865), wife of Sergey Volkonsky a Russian General Decembrist. She voluntarily followed her husband to exile in Siberia. The official naming citation was published by the Minor Planet Center on 25 September 1988.

References

External links 
 Asteroids with Satellites, Robert Johnston, johnstonsarchive.net
 Asteroid Lightcurve Database (LCDB), query form (info )
 Dictionary of Minor Planet Names, Google books
 Discovery Circumstances: Numbered Minor Planets (1)-(5000) – Minor Planet Center
 
 

003703
Discoveries by Lyudmila Chernykh
Discoveries by Nikolai Chernykh
Named minor planets
003703
19780809